Wagram is an unincorporated community in Licking County, in the U.S. state of Ohio.

History
Wagram was originally called Cumberland, and under the latter name was laid out in 1831. A post office called Wagram was established in 1862, and remained in operation until 1907.

Notable people
Jake Miller, a pitcher for the Cleveland Indians and Chicago White Sox, was born in Wagram in 1898.

References

Unincorporated communities in Licking County, Ohio
1831 establishments in Ohio
Populated places established in 1831
Unincorporated communities in Ohio